Just One of the Guys is a 1985 American teen comedy film directed by Lisa Gottlieb and co-written by Dennis Feldman and Jeff Franklin, although according to Gottlieb, she also co-wrote the screenplay together with her writing partner Mitch Giannunzio but then was supposedly denied writing credit by the producers. Just One of the Guys is a loose adaptation of William Shakespeare's Twelfth Night.

The film ranked number 48 on Entertainment Weekly's list of the "50 Best High School Movies".

Plot
Terri Griffith is an aspiring teenage journalist in Phoenix, Arizona, who feels that her teachers do not take her articles seriously because of her good looks. After failing to get her dream job as a newspaper intern, she comes to the conclusion that it is because she is a girl.

With her parents out of town on a two-week Caribbean vacation, Terri decides to remedy the situation. She enrolls as a boy ("Terry") at a rival high school, her real identity known only to her sex-obsessed younger brother, Buddy, and her best friend, Denise. On her first day, she meets Rick Morehouse, a socially awkward transfer student whom she finds attractive. Trying to stay close to Rick, Terry helps him through an image makeover and encourages him to start talking to girls.

After many episodes in and out of school, including fending off a group of bullies led by bodybuilder Greg Tolan, dealing with her real college boyfriend Kevin, and being set up on a blind date with a potential new girlfriend named Sandy, Terry manages to be accepted as "one of the guys".

At the senior prom, a jealous Greg picks a fight with Rick, who ultimately trounces the bully in front of the entire class. When Terri's boyfriend shows up unexpectedly and discovers the ruse, Rick assumes that Terri's big secret was that she was gay. To prove otherwise, Terri opens her shirt and reveals her breasts to Rick. Although she admits to loving him, Rick rejects her, prompting a desperate Terri to kiss him in front of everyone. To placate the awestruck students, Rick derisively announces that Terri "has tits" before leaving the prom and Terri behind.

Heartbroken and humiliated, Terri retreats to her room and writes a long article on what it is like to be a girl in boys' clothing, detailing all of her experiences, both good and bad.

Terri returns to her own school. When her article is printed in the newspaper, she receives high praise and finally earns her dream job at the newspaper. Nevertheless, she still finds herself yearning for Rick, who has not spoken to her since the prom. One day during the summer, Rick suddenly turns up after reading her article. Realizing their true feelings for each other, they reconcile and make plans for another date. They decide to go for a drive in Terri's car, but before Buddy can join them, an attractive blonde on a motorcycle rides up and beckons to him with a smile. Buddy then climbs onto the back of her motorcycle, and both couples happily drive away.

Cast

 Joyce Hyser as Terri/Terry Griffith
 Clayton Rohner as Rick Morehouse
 Billy Jacoby as Buddy Griffith
 Toni Hudson as Denise
 William Zabka as Greg Tolan
 Leigh McCloskey as Kevin
 Sherilyn Fenn as Sandy
 Arye Gross as Willie
 Deborah Goodrich as Deborah
 Stuart Charno as Reptile
 Kenneth Tigar as Mr. Raymaker

Soundtrack

 "Just One of the Guys" by Shalamar – 3:55
 "Girls Got Something Boys Ain't Got" by Midnight Star – 3:56
 "Tonight You're Mine, Baby" by Ronnie Spector – 4:57
 "Prove It to You" by Dwight Twilley – 3:20
 "Jealous" by Berlin – 4:23
 "Way Down" by Billy Burnette – 3:34
 "Burning" by Brock/Davis – 4:20
 "Thrills" by Greg French – 3:15
 "Hard Way" by Brock/Davis – 4:48
 "Guy Talk" by Tom Scott – 2:29

The songs and music that were played in the film, not on the soundtrack.
 "Trouble" by Lindsey Buckingham
 "Down on the Street" by The Stooges
 "Turn Out Right" by Private Domain
 "Comb My Hair" by Johnny Lyon
 "Buns" by Bonedaddys
 "Gone Too Far" by Neurotica

Release
Just One of the Guys was released on April 26, 1985.

Home media
The film was released on Blu-ray Disc under Sony Pictures on April 28, 2020. Special features include filmmaker and cast commentary and theatrical trailer.

Reception
On Rotten Tomatoes it holds a score of 57% based on reviews from 14 critics, with an average rating of 4.80/10. On Metacritic it has a score of 57% based on reviews from 6 critics, indicating "mixed or average reviews".

See also 
 Cross-dressing in film and television

References

External links

 
 
 

1985 films
1985 comedy films
1985 directorial debut films
1980s coming-of-age comedy films
1980s feminist films
1980s high school films
1980s teen comedy films
American coming-of-age comedy films
American feminist comedy films
American high school films
American teen comedy films
Columbia Pictures films
Cross-dressing in American films
Films about proms
Films scored by Tom Scott
Films set in Phoenix, Arizona
Teen films based on works by William Shakespeare
1980s English-language films
1980s American films